Epitrichosma is a genus of moths belonging to the subfamily Tortricinae of the family Tortricidae.

Species
Epitrichosma anisocausta (Turner, 1916)
Epitrichosma argenticola Diakonoff, 1974
Epitrichosma aureola Diakonoff, 1972
Epitrichosma ceramina Common, 1965
Epitrichosma crymodes (Turner, 1916)
Epitrichosma helioconis (Diakonoff, 1948)
Epitrichosma hesperia Common, 1965
Epitrichosma lira Diakonoff, 1972
Epitrichosma luteola Diakonoff, 1974
Epitrichosma mellosa (Diakonoff, 1956)
Epitrichosma metreta Common, 1965
Epitrichosma neurobapta Lower, 1908
Epitrichosma phaulera (Turner, 1916)

See also
List of Tortricidae genera

References

External links
tortricidae.com

Schoenotenini